Papuascincus phaeodes  is a species of skink found in Papua New Guinea and Indonesia.

References

Papuascincus
Reptiles described in 1932
Taxa named by Theodor Vogt